"No Shame" is a song by Australian pop rock band 5 Seconds of Summer, released on 5 February 2020 as the third single from the band's fourth studio album Calm. The song was written by Calum Hood, Luke Hemmings, Ashton Irwin, Michael Clifford, Alexandra Tamposi, Andrew Wotman, Nathan Perez and Donna Lewis.

Music video
An accompanying music video for "No Shame" was released on YouTube on 7 February 2020 and has 19 million views as of March 2021. It was directed by Hannah Lux Davis.

The band is shown performing in a cheetah-print performance box. In between, are shots of the individual members doing an activity linked to a lyric. Calum Hood is shown with a wife and two children. He gives expensive presents to her and they are seen posing for pictures in front of a neatly trimmed lawn. This matches the lyric, "Never enough and no satisfaction." Luke Hemmings's scene comes next. The other band members and crying relatives are attending his funeral. He later arrives clothed in black and it is revealed he faked his own death. It closely mirrors the lyric, "Diggin' my grave to get a reaction." Michael Clifford and a group of friends get into an accident. They immediately take selfies of the incident, presumably to post on social media. The lyric, " I only light up when cameras are flashing" matches this scene. Ashton Irwin is depicted as a kind of plastic surgeon who is performing and operation on a woman. The lyric being described, "Changin' my face and calling it fashion." At the end, all four band performing members remove masks to reveal older men underneath at the wrap of the filming. The song is widely believed to refer to the negative aspects of social media, the music industry, and possibly, paparazzi and fans. Ashton Irwin (band's drummer) confirmed this on Instagram live

Charts

Release history

References

2020 singles
2020 songs
5 Seconds of Summer songs
Song recordings produced by Andrew Watt (record producer)
Songs written by Ali Tamposi
Songs written by Andrew Watt (record producer)
Songs written by Ashton Irwin
Songs written by Calum Hood
Songs written by Luke Hemmings
Songs written by Michael Clifford (musician)
Songs written by Happy Perez
Music videos directed by Hannah Lux Davis